Robert Adrian de Jauralde Hart (1 April 1913 – 7 March 2000) was an English pioneer of forest gardening in temperate zones. He created a model forest garden from a 0.12 acre (500 m²) orchard on his farm. He credits the inspiration for his work to an article by James Sholto Douglas, which was in turn inspired by the work of Toyohiko Kagawa.(page 41)

Early life
Hart, son of a lawyer father and a soprano mother, was born in London and educated at Westminster School, after which he was employed at Reuters news agency in charge of special Indian mails, work which involved compiling digests of weekly articles by Mahatma Gandhi, whose nonviolence philosophy he took on board.

At the outbreak of World War II he considered registering as a conscientious objector but changed mind following retreat from Dunkirk in 1940 and enlisted in the Corps of Military Police, later transferring to the Intelligence Corps to work in code-breaking.

After demobilisation, he was a dairy farmer in Norfolk and Somerset before moving to Shropshire where he took on a smallholding on Wenlock Edge.

Wenlock Edge
Robert Hart began with a smallholding called Highwood Hill farm at Wenlock Edge. His intention was to provide a healthy and therapeutic environment for himself and his brother Lacon, who was born with severe learning disabilities.

Hart though soon discovered that maintaining large annual vegetable beds, rearing livestock and taking care of an orchard were tasks beyond his strength. However, he also observed that a small bed of perennial vegetables and herbs he had planted was looking after itself with little or no intervention. Furthermore, these plants provided interesting and unusual additions to the diet, and seemed to promote health and vigour in both body and mind.

Forest garden project

Noting the maxim of Hippocrates to "make food your medicine and medicine your food", Hart adopted a vegan, 90% raw food diet. The three main products from a forest garden are fruit, nuts and green leafy vegetables. Hart's forest garden at Wenlock Edge was a vegan organic food production system.

He also began to examine the interactions and relationships that take place between plants in natural systems, particularly in woodland, the climax ecosystem of a cool temperate region such as the British Isles. This led him to evolve the agroforestry concept of the "Forest Garden": Based on the observation that the natural forest can be divided into distinct layers or 'storeys', he developed an existing small orchard of apples and pears into an edible landscape consisting of seven dimensions;

A 'canopy' layer consisting of the original mature fruit trees.
A 'low-tree layer' of smaller nut and fruit trees on dwarfing root stocks.
A 'shrub layer' of fruit bushes such as currants and berries.
A 'herbaceous layer' of perennial vegetables and herbs.
A 'ground cover' layer of edible plants that spread horizontally.
A 'rhizosphere' or 'underground' dimension of plants grown for their roots and tubers.
A vertical 'layer' of vines and climbers.

Hart had a vision for the spread of the forest garden throughout even the most heavily built up areas, as he explains:

Later life
Hart died in March 2000 aged 86 and is buried in St Peter's churchyard at Rushbury, Shropshire.

Bibliography
 Inviolable Hills: Ecology, Conservation and Regeneration of the British Uplands, Stuart & W (1968). .
 Forest Farming: Towards a Solution to Problems of World Hunger and Conservation, co-authored with James Sholto Douglas, Rodale Press (1976). .
 Ecosociety: A historical study of ecological man, Natraj (1984). ISBN B0006EHVPW.
 The Forest Garden, Institute for Social Inventions (1987). .
 Forest Gardening: Rediscovering Nature and Community in a Post-Industrial Age, Green Books (UK) (1991, 1996 revised). .
 Can Life Survive?, essay published in Deep Ecology and Anarchism by Freedom Press (1993). .
 Beyond the Forest Garden, Gaia Books, London (1996). .

References

External links

The Garden of Love an article on Robert Hart's garden by Ken Fern of Plants for a Future.
Obituary and A forest garden legacy, The Guardian, April 2000
Obituary in permaculture magazine
Robert Hart and Forest Gardens

2000 deaths
1913 births
English gardeners
20th-century English non-fiction writers
Organic gardeners
Permaculturalists
Gandhians
Nonviolence advocates
20th-century English male writers
English conscientious objectors
British Army personnel of World War II
Royal Military Police soldiers
Intelligence Corps soldiers